Patrick William Flatley (born October 3, 1963) is a Canadian former professional ice hockey forward who played in the NHL for 14 seasons between 1983 and 1997 for the New York Islanders and New York Rangers.

Playing career
Flatley was born in Toronto, Ontario. As a youth, he played in the 1976 Quebec International Pee-Wee Hockey Tournament with the Toronto Shopsy's minor ice hockey team. He attended the University of Wisconsin at Madison, where he played for the Wisconsin Badgers men's ice hockey team for two seasons, helping the team capture the 1983 NCAA Men's ice hockey championship, and was himself named a tournament all-star, a WCHA first team all-star, and a 1983 All-American.

Flatley was drafted 21st overall by the New York Islanders in the 1982 NHL Entry Draft, and scored on his first NHL shot on goal, against Doug Soetaert of the Winnipeg Jets. Playing for the Canadian National Team in 1983–84, he scored 34 goals in 54 games. Rejoining the Islanders for the 1984-85 season, he was put on a line with Brent Sutter and Clark Gillies, and scored 9 goals through the first three rounds of the playoffs, becoming a big contributor in the Islanders' drive for their fifth consecutive Stanley Cup. However, the Islanders lost in the finals to the Wayne Gretzky-led Edmonton Oilers.

Although he never emerged as a top scorer, Flatley did become a highly effective role player, adding smart positional play, strong defense, and grit to the Islanders teams in the late 1980s and 1990s. Flatley was sometimes referred to as "the chairman of the boards" because he rarely failed to dig the puck out in battles in the corners.  In 1991 he was named the Islanders' fifth captain. Prior  to  the  1996-97  season, Flatley  signed  a  one-year  deal  with  the  New  York  Rangers.

He played 780 career NHL games, scoring 170 goals and 340 assists for 510 points. His best offensive season, points-wise, was the 1992–93 season when he scored 47 assists and 60 points.

Collegiate career 
Flatley was a member of the University of Wisconsin–Madison NCAA Men's Ice Hockey Championship team of 1983, and national finalist of 1982.

Awards and honours
Jan 15, 2012 Pat Flatley was the 12th player inducted into the New York Islanders Hall of Fame.

Pat Flatley was named to the Etobicoke Sports Hall of Fame in 2007.

Career statistics

Regular season and playoffs

International

Personal
His niece, Shannon Flatley competes for the Brown Bears women's ice hockey program.

References

External links 
 

1963 births
Living people
Canadian ice hockey forwards
Ice hockey people from Toronto
Ice hockey players at the 1984 Winter Olympics
Olympic ice hockey players of Canada
National Hockey League first-round draft picks
New York Islanders draft picks
New York Islanders players
New York Rangers players
Springfield Indians players
Wisconsin Badgers men's ice hockey players
NCAA men's ice hockey national champions
AHCA Division I men's ice hockey All-Americans